William Francis O'Shea, M.M. (1884–1945) was an American Roman Catholic bishop who served as the Vicar Apostolic of Heijo in Korea from 1939 to 1944.

Born in Greenwich Valley of New York City, New York, United States on 9 December 1884, he was ordained a priest for the Catholic Foreign Mission Society of America on 5 December 1917. O'Shea was appointed the Vicar Apostolic of Heijo and Titular Bishop of Naissus on 11 July 1939. He was consecrated by Pope Pius XII on 29 October 1939, with archbishops Celso Benigno Luigi Costantini and Henri Streicher serving as co-consecrators.

O'Shea resigned on 17 April 1944 and died on 22 February 1945, aged 60.

References 

1884 births
1945 deaths
20th-century American Roman Catholic titular bishops
Maryknoll bishops
Clergy from New York City
20th-century Roman Catholic bishops in Korea
Roman Catholic bishops of Pyongyang